Hey Rosetta! is a Canadian seven-piece indie rock band from St. John's, Newfoundland and Labrador and led by singer/songwriter Tim Baker. The band created a sound by incorporating piano, violin, cello, and brass into the traditional four-piece rock setup. On October 13, 2017, the group announced via Facebook post that they would be taking an indefinite hiatus.

History
The origin of the band's name is inspired from the Rosetta Stone which was a stele written in three languages: Ancient Egyptian Hieroglyphs, Demotic and Ancient Greek.

Formation & EP (2005)
In 2005, Baker had returned to St. John's from his travels across Canada and the U.S. with a head full of songs that he had written on acoustic guitar and piano. Soon realizing that the material he had written should sound bigger and required more elements, he brought together a band of St. John’s musicians, with Adam Hogan on electric guitar, Josh Ward on bass, and Dave Lane on drums. After a few rehearsals, the band added cello and violin players and arranged their first show, choosing the name "Hey Rosetta!".

Playing at Roxxy’s (now The Levee), the band generated a rapid impact around the local music scene and in the media, being named the "buzz band" of the 2005 Music NL Conference. Within a matter of months, the band had recorded and self-released a demo, simply entitled EP, consisting of 4 studio songs, as well as three more songs put to tape during a live performance at The Ship Pub. Songs such as "Go Henry", "Plug Your Ears" and "The Simplest Thing" soon began to be heard on XM Satellite Radio's program The Verge, as well as on local radio stations in Newfoundland.

Plan Your Escape LP & EP (2006–07)
In the winter of 2006, the band went into the studio with producer Don Ellis to begin work on their first LP, Plan Your Escape. The album featured 13 songs, including new recordings of "The Simplest Thing" and "Epitaph", which had been featured on their EP. The band released the singles "Yes! Yes! Yes!" followed by "Lions for Scottie", which was featured as the iTunes Single of the Week.

Plan Your Escape earned the band widespread success as well as critical acclaim. At the 2006 Music NL Awards, Hey Rosetta! won Group of the Year, Pop/Rock Group of the Year, CBC Galaxie Rising Star of the Year, and Album of the Year. In 2007, Plan Your Escape was nominated for the Newcap Rock Recording of the Year at the East Coast Music Awards. Also in 2007, Hey Rosetta! signed on to Canadian label Sonic Records. Plan Your Escape was re-mastered and re-released as a 7 track EP on the Sonic label.

Into Your Lungs (2007–09)
After touring across most of Canada in support of the Plan Your Escape EP release, Hey Rosetta! was ready to create a sophomore record of their newer, more cinematic material. At the end of 2007, the band, now featuring current members Phil Maloney on drums and Kinley Dowling on violin, stationed themselves in the Sonic Temple studio in Halifax, Nova Scotia, working with producer Hawksley Workman to cull a twelve-song album from a larger batch of new songs.

Their second proper album and their first on Sonic Records, Into Your Lungs (and around in your heart and on through your blood), was released in June 2008. The album featured a more expansive sound, deeper lyrical themes, and more shifts between quiet and loud. The first single "Red Heart" was a success and was later used in CTV’s 2010 Vancouver Olympic broadcast as an anthem of Canadian pride during Stephen Brunt’s retrospective montage.

2008 and 2009 saw the band touring the world in support of Into Your Lungs, now playing shows across Canada, the United States, Europe, and Australia. Touring cellist Romesh Thavanathan became a permanent member of the band’s lineup. At the inaugural Verge Music Awards, hosted by XM Satellite Radio’s The Verge, Into Your Lungs was named Album of the Year, chosen by fans via an online vote. The band was also a finalist for Artist of the Year. At the 2009 East Coast Music Awards, the band took home three awards including Group Recording of the Year, Recording of the Year, and Alternative Recording of the Year, all for Into Your Lungs. Baker was also nominated for Songwriter of the Year, but the award was won by Gordie Sampson (with J. Smith & J. T. Harding). That same year, Into Your Lungs was nominated and shortlisted for the Polaris Music Prize.

Hey Rosetta! also contributed a new song to the first ever CBC Great Canadian Song Quest in 2009, writing "Old Crow Black Night Stand Still", which was inspired by Gros Morne National Park in their home province of Newfoundland and Labrador. "Red Song", another new track that appeared live, was released on vinyl along with two other tracks as the Red Songs EP. The digital version of that EP also contained an earlier version of the song "Bandages", which would soon become a part of the band’s third LP.

Seeds (2010–12)

Recorded in two sessions in April and May 2010, the band’s third album Seeds was their biggest release to date. Now having an established worldwide fan base, the anticipation for the album was high and the band wanted the sound to be "lighter and yet bigger", more orchestral but also more intimate. To achieve this, they enlisted the help of producer Tony Doogan, having admired his work with artists like Mogwai, Wintersleep, and Belle & Sebastian.

Released in February, 2011, Seeds was an instant success, reaching the top of the iTunes Canadian album charts. The first 5000 copies of the album contained a special piece of seed paper created by Janet Power, which grew into vegetable plants when watered and planted in soil. This was tied thematically with the album’s concepts and symbolism, but also to a more literal message of support for sustainable agriculture and food security. The band has continued to work in this field since and in 2012, Baker undertook a trip to Honduras with USC Canada’s Seeds of Survival program, to witness the impact of new farming and agricultural techniques in struggling regions first-hand.

The Seeds tours in 2011 and 2012 saw the band playing even larger venues, including a showcase at the World Expo in Shanghai and a Canada Day Performance on Toronto Island with The Tragically Hip and Broken Social Scene in July 2011. In 2012, Hey Rosetta! were signed to their American label, ATO Records, and released Seeds in the U.S. in May. That summer, they toured across North America and Europe, playing many of the major outdoor music festivals, including Bonnaroo, Lollapalooza, Sasquatch, and the Hangout Music Festival.

A Cup of Kindness Yet EP (2012)
In between touring dates in 2012, the band were fitting in studio time to compile a Christmas EP, including a cover version of "O Come O Come Emmanuel", as well as three original winter-themed songs. A Cup of Kindness Yet was released in late November 2012, and was celebrated with a two-night run of Christmas shows at Mile One Stadium in St. John’s. The band has made yearly Christmas shows a tradition in their hometown, and 2012 marked their biggest production yet.

Second Sight (2014)

Recording began for the band's fourth studio album Second Sight in the summer of 2013 and continued off and on until May 2014. The album's lead single, "Kintsukuroi" was released via Sonic Records on August 4, 2014. The album was officially released in Canada on October 21, 2014. It was released in Germany and Australia on October 24, 2014, and on January 27, 2015 in the United States of America. A second single, "Soft Offering (For The Oft Suffering)", was released September 12, 2014 via Sonic Records' Soundcloud.

In October 2015, the band collaborated with Yukon Blonde on the non-album single "Land You Love", a protest song about the 2015 federal election.

Fogo Sessions
In addition to the studio versions of the tracks on Second Sight, the band also did a series of recordings on Fogo Island, NL. The band did live recordings of at least three of the tracks from Second Sight. The first video to be released from these sessions was "Soft Offering (For The Oft Suffering)" which premiered via Rolling Stone Australia. It was recorded in the Long Studio as part of a Fogo Island Arts residency. The second session to be released was "What Arrows" via USA Today. It was recorded at a church in the town of Seldom-Come-By, NL.

On January 1, 2017, Hey Rosetta! was part of CBC's The Strombo Show'''s Hip 30, which featured Canadian bands covering songs from The Tragically Hip to commemorate the Hip's 30th anniversary, performing a medley of "Stay" from Music @ Work with the title track from Now for Plan A.

 Hiatus (2017–present) 
On October 13, 2017, the band announced thought Facebook that they would be going on an indefinite hiatus, stating that some of the members felt they needed a break from the band, as well as that all of them had decided to focus on their own projects outside of the band for the time being. The band announced that they would play a short series of farewell shows in December: three shows in Toronto and two shows in St. John's. The band played their final show on December 22, 2017 at Mile One Centre, St. John's Newfoundland & Labrador. It featured a heartfelt compilation vignette of the band's touring experiences since their beginning, and a farewell slide thanking everyone from fans to family, media, sponsors and passersby for their support over the years. It also stated 'we will see you again soon.' A cover of 'Stand by Me' was performed, and the website description on Google has since been changed to match the name of the song. Closing the concert the group threw their drumsticks to the crowd and hugged in tears.

Members
Current
Tim Baker
Adam Hogan
Phil Maloney
Josh Ward
Kinley Dowling
Romesh Thavanathan
Mara Pellerin

Former
Kalen Thomson
Kate Bevan-Baker
Erin Aurich
Jessie Tesolin
Heather Kao
Tiffany Pollock
Ben Trovato
Derek Pink
David Lane
Adam Staple
Ariane Alexander

Discography
Studio albums
 2006: Plan Your Escape 2008: Into Your Lungs (and around in your heart and on through your blood) 2011: Seeds 2014: Second SightEPs
 2005: Hey Rosetta! EP 2007: Plan Your Escape EP (Sonic Records)
 2009: Old Crow Black Night Stand Still (Great Canadian Song Quest, CBC Music)
 2010: Red Songs EP 2012: Sing Sing Sessions EP No. 74 CAN
 2012: A Cup of Kindness Yet EP'' (Christmas Album)

Singles

See also

Canadian rock
List of Canadian musicians
List of bands from Canada

References

External links
 Hey Rosetta! official site
 CBC News Breakup Announcement (CBC)
 

Musical groups established in 2005
Canadian indie rock groups
Musical groups from St. John's, Newfoundland and Labrador
Canadian pop rock music groups
Dine Alone Records artists
ATO Records artists